Johannes Gumpp (born 14 August 1626 in Innsbruck, lived at least until 1646) was an Austrian painter.

He is notable for his 1646 self-portrait showing him looking into a mirror while painting himself. The painting is on display in the Vasari corridor which connects to the Uffizi Gallery, Florence. He created another similar painting and is known for no other works.

Gumpp was born in Innsbruck and was the son of Christoph Gumpp, an architect. He was likely part of the same Gumpp family that produced artists in the 16th and 18th centuries.

Bibliography
 Rave, Paul Ortwin, Das Selbstbildnis des Johannes Gumpp in den Uffizien, Pantheon, 18, 1960 pages 28–31.
 Gli Uffizi Catalogo generale, N° A437, page 883, Florence, 1980, Centro Di .
 D. T., Saur, Allgemeines Künstler Lexikon, Saur, Munich-Leipzig, 2009, volume 65, p. 48.

References

External links
 

1626 births
17th-century Austrian painters
Austrian male painters
Year of death unknown
Artists from Innsbruck